Jung Bo-ram (born 22 July 1991) is a South Korean footballer who plays as a goalkeeper for Hwacheon KSPO and the South Korea national team.

International career
Jung played two matches for the South Korea U17 team in 2007. She made her full international debut on 7 June 2016 in a friendly match against Myanmar.

References

External links

1991 births
Living people
South Korean women's footballers
Women's association football goalkeepers
South Korea women's under-17 international footballers
South Korea women's international footballers
2019 FIFA Women's World Cup players
WK League players
Footballers at the 2018 Asian Games
Asian Games bronze medalists for South Korea
Asian Games medalists in football
Medalists at the 2018 Asian Games